Gordon Laro (born April 17, 1972) is a former American football tight end. Laro played college football at Boston College. He was a member of the Jacksonville Jaguars for their inaugural season in 1995, where he appeared in two games for the team.

References 

Living people
1972 births
American football tight ends
Jacksonville Jaguars players
Boston College Eagles football players
Players of American football from Massachusetts
People from Lynn, Massachusetts